Karonga is a township in the Karonga District in Northern Region of Malawi. Located on the western shore of Lake Nyasa, it was established as a slaving centre sometime before 1877. As of 2018 estimates, Karonga has a population of 61,609. The common and major language spoken in this district is the Tumbuka language, which is also a regional language of Northen Malawi.

History
Pre-historic tools and remains of hominids discovered in Malawi's remote northern district of Karonga provides further proof that the area could be the cradle of humankind. Professor Friedemann Schrenk of the Goethe University in Frankfurt told Reuters News that two students working on the excavation site in September 2009 had discovered prehistoric tools and a tooth of a hominid. "This latest discovery of prehistoric tools and remains of hominids provides additional proof to the theory that the Great Rift Valley of Africa and perhaps the excavation site near Karonga can be considered the cradle of humankind." Schrenk said. The site also contains some of the earliest dinosaurs which lived between 100 million and 140 million years ago and early hominids believed to have lived between a million and 6 million years ago. The discovery was at Malema excavation site  from Karonga.

In terms of more recent prehistory, Karonga has an abundance of Pleistocene and Holocene archaeological materials dating especially to the Middle and Later Stone Ages, as well as the Iron Age.<ref>{{cite journal|doi=10.1002/gea.21469 | volume=29 | title=Renewed Geoarchaeological Investigations of Mwangandas Village (Elephant Butchery Site), Karonga, Malawi | journal=Geoarchaeology | pages=98–120 | last1 = Wright | first1 = David K.| year=2014 | issue=2 }}</ref>

Some time before 1877 Karonga existed as the stronghold of Mlozi, a famous Arab slaver. In 1883 a British trading post, which formed the basis of the modern town, was opened there. British explorer Sir Harry Johnston bought the post in 1895 and ended the slave trade on Lake Nyasa's western shore. At this point Karonga became an important commercial and agricultural centre. According to Lonely Planet, the town "still bears a strong Swahili-Arab influence today."

On 11 July 2008 the Kayelekera mine in Karonga celebrated 1.5 million hours of accident-free uranium mining. "Analysts" claim this is a rare achievement. The mine previously met with controversy due to exposing people to radiation.

In December 2009 the area suffered a series of earthquakes.

Geography

Demographics

Languages
Tumbuka is commonly used in Karonga for both home and school. Karonga is known as "an island of Tumbuka language and culture in a sea of Ngonde people''."

Economy
The economy of the area is based on cotton, rice and maize production along the lake and on coffee and livestock in the west. Karongans are dependent on subsistence fishing.

Climate

Karonga's climate is classified as tropical. The summers are much rainier than the winters in Karonga. The climate here is classified as Aw by the Köppen-Geiger system. In Karonga, the average annual temperature is 25.6 °C (78.8 °F).

Arts and culture
The Cultural & Museum Centre Karonga is Karonga's most popular attraction to tourists. It displays an exhibit entitled "From Dinosaurs to Democracy", which chronicles the area's history.

Infrastructure
Karonga is home to the Karonga Airport which handles only daytime domestic flights for Air Malawi. Buses travel from Mzuzu and Nkhata Bay to Karonga.

Notes

References

External links 

Lake Malawi
Karonga District
Populated places in Northern Region, Malawi
1883 establishments in the British Empire